Alida "Ada" Cornelia Bolten (20 October 1903 – 29 January 1984) was a Dutch freestyle swimmer who competed in the 1924 Summer Olympics. She was born and died in Amsterdam. She was the sister of Wim Bolten. In 1924 she was a member of the Dutch relay team which finished sixth in the 4 × 100 metre freestyle relay competition.

References

External links
profile

1903 births
1984 deaths
Dutch female freestyle swimmers
Olympic swimmers of the Netherlands
Swimmers at the 1924 Summer Olympics
Swimmers from Amsterdam
20th-century Dutch women